Leila Salazar-López has served as the Executive Director of the non-profit Amazon Watch since 2015. As Amazon Watch’s Executive Director, Salazar-López  leads the organization in its efforts to protect and defend the bio-cultural and climate integrity of the Amazon rainforest by partnering with indigenous peoples to protect their rights and territories. 

She has also led Amazon Watch in cooperation with organizations like Greenpeace, 350, Sierra Club, Rainforest Action Network, and more, in efforts to ensure corporate accountability, respect for indigenous rights, and the preservation of the Amazon ecosystem. Salazar-López appeared as a guest on the broadcast, 24 Hours of Climate Reality, part of the Climate Reality Project, where she discussed the importance of protecting the Amazon region.

Biography 

Leila Salazar-López graduated from the University of California, Santa Barbara in 1998 with a Bachelor of Arts in Environmental Studies and Political Science. She has worked in the field of human rights and climate change for over twenty years as a grassroots organizer and international advocacy director for Amazon Watch, Rainforest Action Network, Global Exchange, and Green Corps.

Salazar-López lives in San Francisco, CA with her husband and two young daughters. She identifies as a “proud Chicana-Latina woman”, and describes herself as a “passionate defender of Mother Earth, the Amazon, indigenous rights and climate justice.”

Appearances 

Salazar-López has made appearances at a variety of conferences to advocate for the Amazon rainforest region and its Indigenous inhabitants. Some of her speeches and presentations include:
 
 Women Leading Solutions on the Frontline of Climate Change - April 29, 2017, Washington, D.C.
 
 Latinas Leading Change for Climate Justice and Solutions – October 21, 2016, National Bioneers Conference, San Rafael, California. 
 
 Over the Ruins of Amazonia: Colonial Violence and De-colonial Resistance at the Frontiers of Climate Change - Oct 26, 2015, at University of California Santa Barbara, California 
 
 Amazon: Defending Rivers and Rights – March 19, Berkeley, California

Publications 

Salazar-López has written and contributed to a variety of articles including;

 China’s Other Big Export Product: Pollution co-authored with Paulina Garzón, published in the New York Times, 21/7/2017  
 
 What China and California have in common – the Amazon? Published in The Mercury News, 06/13/2017 
 
 ‘The Amazon is Life:’ Q&A with Sheyla Juruna, Indigenous woman warrior from the Brazilian Amazon Published in Earth Island Journal, 10/12/2011

References

External links

Living people
Year of birth missing (living people)
American women environmentalists
American environmentalists
Climate activists
21st-century American women